Broadway is a village and civil parish in Somerset, England, situated  west of Ilminster and  north of Chard in the South Somerset district.  The parish has a population of 740. The parish includes the nearby hamlet of Hare.

History

In the Domesday Book of 1086, the village was known as Bradewei and located in ancient hundred of Abdick.

By the 14th century, Broadway was part of the hundred of Abdick and Bulstone. Broadway was known as Brodewaye in 1586.

Everys Almhouses date from the late 16th or early 17th century. They were founded after litigation over the 1558 will of Alexander Every.

The Tudor Cottage on Broadway Street was built as a farmhouse in the 16th century.

Governance

The parish council has responsibility for local issues, including setting an annual precept (local rate) to cover the council's operating costs and producing annual accounts for public scrutiny. The parish council evaluates local planning applications and works with the local police, district council officers, and neighbourhood watch groups on matters of crime, security, and traffic. The parish council's role also includes initiating projects for the maintenance and repair of parish facilities, as well as consulting with the district council on the maintenance, repair, and improvement of highways, drainage, footpaths, public transport, and street cleaning. Conservation matters (including trees and listed buildings) and environmental issues are also the responsibility of the council.

The village falls within the Non-metropolitan district of South Somerset, which was formed on 1 April 1974 under the Local Government Act 1972, having previously been part of Chard Rural District. The district council is responsible for local planning and building control, local roads, council housing, environmental health, markets and fairs, refuse collection and recycling, cemeteries and crematoria, leisure services, parks, and tourism.

Somerset County Council is responsible for running the largest and most expensive local services such as education, social services, libraries, main roads, public transport, policing and fire services, trading standards, waste disposal and strategic planning.

The village is in the 'Neroche' electoral ward. This ward stretches from Ashill in the north, through Broadway to Donyatt in the south. The total population taken at the 2011 census was 2,428.

It is also part of the Yeovil county constituency represented in the House of Commons of the Parliament of the United Kingdom. It elects one Member of Parliament (MP) by the first past the post system of election. It was part of the South West England constituency of the European Parliament prior to Britain leaving the European Union in January 2020, which elected seven MEPs using the d'Hondt method of party-list proportional representation.

Religious sites

The Church of St. Aldhelm and St. Eadburgha dates from the 13th century, and has been designated by English Heritage as a grade I listed building. Its isolated position away from the village is thought to be because of an outbreak of the plague. The churchyard cross is also from the 13th century.

References

External links

Villages in South Somerset
Civil parishes in Somerset